Page Turner may refer to:

Arts and entertainment
 Page-turner, a person who turns pages of sheet music for a musician during a performance
 The Page Turner, a 2006 French film
 Page Turner (artist), a contemporary Mormon feminist artist
 "Page Turner" (CSI: NY), an episode of CSI: NY
 Page Turner (TV series)
 "Page Turner", an annual festival hosted by The Asian American Writers' Workshop
 "Page Turner", an episode of Star vs. the Forces of Evil cartoon
 a.k.a. Paper knife.

Other uses
 Sir Gregory Page-Turner, 3rd Baronet (1748–1805), wealthy landowner and politician